Heed the Thunder is a 1946 American crime novel by Jim Thompson. It was Thompson's second novel.

Reissue
The Canadian Studio Pocket Books reissue was retitled Sins of the Fathers and listed the author as James Thompson.

References

1946 American novels
Novels by Jim Thompson